Royal Naval Hospital (Hong Kong) was the Royal Navy's medical facility in the colony.

The RNH began in 1841 in a matshed on the site of the Wellington Barracks on Hong Kong Island. A typhoon destroyed the hospital and was temporarily located on HMS Minden, a third-rate sailing ship. This ship was replaced by HMS Alligator in 1846, a sixth-rate frigate and HMS Melville, another third-rate sailing ship in 1857.

The hospital returned to shore briefly at the Seamen's Hospital in 1873 and then to the Mount Shadwell, now home to Ruttonjee Hospital until it was destroyed during World War II. The funding for the Seamen's Hospital came from HMS Melville, which was sold for HK$35,000, after which the proceeds were used to establish the shore facilities.

After the war the RNH was located on two floors of the Queen Mary Hospital. In 1946 the hospital relocated to the War Memorial Nursing Home on the Peak (Mount Kellett Road) until it was closed in 1956. The War Memorial Nursing Home merged with Matilda Hospital to form the Matilda and War Memorial Hospital, later renamed Matilda International Hospital. Naval medical services and patients were transferred to the British Military Hospital, Hong Kong in Kowloon after 1956.

References

External links

 The Royal Naval Hospital, Hong Kong

British military hospitals
Defunct hospitals in Hong Kong
Hospitals established in 1841
1956 disestablishments in Hong Kong
1841 establishments in Hong Kong
Royal Navy Medical Service